Sergio Rodríguez Pulido (born May 6, 1995) is a Mexican footballer who currently plays for Tlaxcala F.C.

Honours

Club
 América
 Liga MX: Apertura 2014
 CONCACAF Champions League: 2014–15

References

External links
Soccerway profile

1995 births
Living people
Mexican footballers
Association football wingers
Club América footballers
Venados F.C. players
Tlaxcala F.C. players
Liga MX players
Ascenso MX players
Liga Premier de México players
Sportspeople from Querétaro City
Footballers from Querétaro